The pyramid of Khafre or of Chephren is the middle of the three Ancient Egyptian Pyramids of Giza, the second tallest and second largest of the group. It is the tomb of the Fourth-Dynasty pharaoh Khafre (Chefren), who ruled .

Size
It is made of limestone blocks weighing more than 2 tons each. The slope of the pyramid rises at a 53° 13' angle, steeper than its neighbor, the pyramid of Khufu, which has an angle of 51°50'24". Khafre's pyramid sits on bedrock 10 m (33 ft) higher than Khufu's pyramid, which makes it appear to be taller.

History

The pyramid was likely opened and robbed during the First Intermediate Period. During the Nineteenth Dynasty, the overseer of temple construction took casing stones to build a temple in Heliopolis on Ramesses II's orders.

Arab historian Ibn Abd al-Salam recorded that the pyramid was opened in 1372 AD. On the wall of the burial chamber, there is an Arabic graffito that probably dates from the same time.

It is not known when the rest of the casing stones were robbed; they were presumably still in place by 1646, when John Greaves, professor of Astronomy at the University of Oxford in his Pyramidographia, wrote that, while its stones were not as large or as regularly laid as in Khufu's, the surface was smooth and even free of breaches or inequalities, except on the south.
	
The pyramid was first explored in modern times by Giovanni Belzoni on March 2, 1818, when the original entrance was found on the north side. Belzoni had hopes of finding an intact burial but the chamber was empty except for an open sarcophagus and its broken lid on the floor.
	
The first complete exploration was conducted by John Perring in 1837. In 1853, Auguste Mariette partially excavated Khafre's valley temple, and, in 1858, while completing its clearance, he managed to discover a diorite statue of Khafre.

Construction
Like the Great Pyramid, a rock outcropping was used in the core. Due to the slope of the plateau, the northwest corner was cut 10 m (33  ft) out of the rock subsoil, and the southeast corner was built up.

The pyramid is built of horizontal courses. The courses are rough and irregular for the first half of its height but a narrow band of regular masonry is clear in the midsection of the pyramid. At the northwest corner of the pyramid, the bedrock was fashioned into steps. Casing stones cover the top third of the pyramid, but the pyramidion and part of the apex are missing.

The bottom course of casing stones was made out of pink granite but the remainder of the pyramid was cased in Tura limestone.  Close examination reveals that the corner edges of the remaining casing stones are not completely straight, but are staggered by a few millimeters. One theory is that this is due to settling from seismic activity. An alternative theory postulates that the slope on the blocks was cut to shape before being placed due to the limited working space towards the top of the pyramid.

Interior

Two entrances lead to the burial chamber, one that opens  up the face of the pyramid and one that opens at the base of the pyramid. The lower descending passageway is carved completely out of the bedrock, descending, running horizontal, then ascending to join the horizontal passage leading to the burial chamber.

One theory as to why there are two entrances is that the pyramid's northern base was intended to be shifted  further to the north which would make Khafre's pyramid much larger than his father's. This would place the entrance to the lower descending passage within the masonry of the pyramid. While the bedrock is cut away farther from the pyramid on the north side than on the west side, it is not clear that there is enough room on the plateau for the enclosure wall and pyramid terrace. An alternative theory is that, as with many earlier pyramids, plans were changed and the entrance was moved midway through construction.

There is a subsidiary chamber, equal in length to the King's Chamber in Khufu's pyramid, that opens to the west of the lower passage, the purpose of which is uncertain. It may be used to store offerings, store burial equipment, or it may be a serdab chamber. The upper descending passage is clad in granite and descends to join with the horizontal passage to the burial chamber.

The burial chamber was carved out of a pit in the bedrock. The roof is constructed of gabled limestone beams.  The chamber is rectangular, and is oriented east-west.  Khafre's sarcophagus was carved out of a solid block of granite and sunk partially in the floor, in it, Belzoni found bones of an animal, possibly a bull. Another pit in the floor likely contained the canopic chest, its lid would have been one of the pavement slabs.

There are two small rectangular holes in the walls of the burial chamber facing each other, greatly resembling the openings of the 'air shafts' found in the Great pyramid burial chambers.

Pyramid complex

Satellite pyramid

Along the centerline of the pyramid on the south side was a satellite pyramid, but almost nothing remains other than some core blocks and the outline of the foundation. It contains two descending passages, one of them ending in a dead end with a niche which contained pieces of ritualistic furniture.

Khafre's temples
The temples of Khafre's complex survive in much better condition than Khufu's, this being especially true to the Valley Temple, which is substantially preserved.
To the east of the Pyramid sits the mortuary temple. Though it is now largely in ruins, enough of it survives to understand the plan. It is larger than previous temples and is the first to include all five standard elements of later mortuary temples: an entrance hall, a columned court, five niches for statues of the pharaoh, five storage chambers, and an inner sanctuary. There were over 50 life size statues of Khafre, but these were removed and recycled, possibly by Ramses II. The temple was built of megalithic blocks (the largest is an estimated 400 tonnes).

A causeway runs  to the valley temple, which is very similar to the mortuary temple.  It is built of megalithic blocks sheathed in red granite. The square pillars of the T-shaped hallway were made of solid granite, and the floor was paved in alabaster. The exterior was built of huge blocks, some weighing over 100 tonnes.
Though devoid of any internal decoration, this temple would have been filled with symbolism: two doors open into a vestibule and a large pillared hall, in which there were sockets in the floor that would have fixed 23 statues of Khafre. These columns have since been plundered. The interior, made of granite of the Valley Temple, is remarkably well preserved. The exterior made of limestone is much more weathered.

The so-called temple of the Sphinx is not attested to any king, but structural similarities to Khafre's mortuary temple point to him as its builder. Opening to a hall with 24 columns, each with its own statue, two sanctuaries and symmetric design, it is possible but unsure if this temple had any symbolism attached to the finished plan.

Sphinx

The Great Sphinx may have been part of the complex. It was carved out of a rock formation used to cut the blocks for the pyramid itself.

See also
Egyptian pyramid construction techniques
List of Egyptian pyramids
List of megalithic sites
List of tallest structures built before the 20th century

References

Sources

External links

 Giza Pyramids Archives

Buildings and structures completed in the 26th century BC
Giza pyramid complex
Pyramids of the Fourth Dynasty of Egypt
Khafre
Buildings and structures in Giza